Sarah Pedinotti is an American songwriter and musician originally from Saratoga Springs, NY. She is the lead singer and songwriter of the band Railbird. In March 2011 Railbird toured to and from SXSW supporting their debut, self-released album, No One. Recorded mostly in Queens, and partly in upstate, NY, No One is a conceptual album that took a year and a half to complete. In December 2010 Railbird was featured as of the "Top Five Bands You Should Know About" in Relix Magazine.

Pedinotti is one of seven in a family of artists. She began writing, singing and playing piano at an early age influenced by an eclectic assortment of music.  Her father, David Pedinotti, is also a musician who plays guitar, blues harmonica, and banjo.

In the summer of 1996, her parents started a restaurant in Saratoga Springs called One Caroline Street Bistro. Sarah began singing there when she was twelve, sitting in with the nightly featured artists. Over the years she has performed with many artists including members of The Wynton Marsalis Lincoln Center Jazz Orchestra; Marcus Printup, Eric Lewis and Ali Jackson.  She was taken under the wing of Lee Shaw (a student of Oscar Peterson), who taught her musical theory and history from a first hand perspective.

References

 http://www.relix.com/on-the-verge/2010/12/03/railbird
 https://secure.timesunion.com/calendar/headliner.asp?headlinerID=2685
 http://railbirdband.com/?page_id=65

External links
 Website
 Personal biography

Year of birth missing (living people)
People from Saratoga Springs, New York
Living people
Musicians from Hartford, Connecticut
Singer-songwriters from New York (state)
Okkervil River members
Singer-songwriters from Connecticut